Lorne Street Primary School is a primary school in Glasgow, Scotland. The building was designed by H&D Barclay and opened in 1892. It is now protected as a category B listed building.

Notable staff 
 John Maclean, socialist politician and former teacher at the school until his dismissal in 1915 for his political activism

References

External links
 

Primary schools in Glasgow
Category B listed buildings in Glasgow
Listed schools in Scotland
Educational institutions established in 1892
1892 establishments in Scotland
Govan